Xhosores is a genus of wrinkled bark beetles in the family Carabidae. Xhosores figuratus, found in South Africa, is the only species of this genus.

References

Rhysodinae
Monotypic beetle genera